Hana Mandlíková and Wendy Turnbull defeated Claudia Kohde-Kilsch and Helena Suková in the final, 6–4, 6–7(4–7), 6–3 to win the doubles tennis title at the March edition of the 1986 Virginia Slims Championships.

Martina Navratilova and Pam Shriver were the five-time defending champions, but were defeated in the semifinals by Mandlíková and Turnbull.

Seeds

Draw

Draw

References
 Official Results Archive (ITF)
 Official Results Archive (WTA)

Doubles
Doubles